Presso was a Finnish language weekly business magazine published in Helsinki, Finland, between October 2004 and November 2007.

History and profile
Presso was started as a Saturday supplement of the daily Kauppalehti. In October 2004 it became a weekly published on Saturdays.

The publisher and owner of Presso was Alma Media. It was based in Helsinki and served the Greater Helsinki area. The magazine was published in a half Nordic format.

Presso was named as the Best Designed Publication and was given the 2005 European Newspaper Award in the category of weekly publications.

The 2005 circulation of Presso was 50,000 copies.

The magazine ceased publication in November 2007.

See also
List of magazines in Finland

References

2004 establishments in Finland
2007 disestablishments in Finland
Defunct magazines published in Finland
Business magazines published in Finland
Magazines established in 2004
Magazines disestablished in 2007
Magazines published in Helsinki
Newspaper supplements
Weekly magazines published in Finland